Geneva State Park is a  public recreation area located on the shore of Lake Erie in Geneva, Ashtabula County, Ohio, United States. Park activities include hiking, camping, fishing, boating, canoeing and swimming, snowmobiling, cross-country skiing, and ice fishing. The state park offers access to Lake Erie's central basin through a six-lane boat ramp and marina. Overnight accommodations include a concessionaire-operated lodge with lakeside cottages.

References

External links
Geneva State Park Ohio Department of Natural Resources
Geneva State Park Map Ohio Department of Natural Resources 
The Lodge at Geneva-on-the-Lake Delaware North Parks & Resort
Geneva Marina 

State parks of Ohio
Protected areas of Ashtabula County, Ohio
Protected areas established in 1964
1964 establishments in Ohio